Le Roi des médiums, also known as Apparitions fantômatiques and known in English as King of the Mediums, was a 1909 French short silent film by Georges Méliès.

Méliès played a magician in the film. It was sold by Méliès's Star Film Company and is numbered 1522-1529 in its catalogues, where it was advertised with the descriptive subtitle apparitions fantômatiques (ghostly apparitions). The film has sometimes been referred to by this subtitle.

No English-language release is known for this film, but the translated title King of the Mediums has been used in film reference. The film is currently presumed lost.

References

External links
 

French black-and-white films
Films directed by Georges Méliès
French silent short films
Lost French films
1909 lost films